Upminster Bridge is a London Underground station in the Upminster Bridge neighbourhood of Upminster in the London Borough of Havering, east London. The station was opened on 17 December 1934 by the London, Midland and Scottish Railway on the local electrified tracks between Upminster and Barking that were constructed in 1932. The main station building, on Upminster Road, is of a distinctive polygonal design by William Henry Hamlyn. It has relatively low usage for a suburban station, with approximately 1.15 million passenger entries/exits in 2017.

History
The London, Tilbury and Southend Railway from London Fenchurch Street and Barking was constructed through the Upminster Bridge area in 1885, with stations at Hornchurch and Upminster. The Whitechapel and Bow Railway opened in 1902 and allowed through-services of the District Railway to operate to Upminster. Delayed by World War I, electrified tracks were extended by the London, Midland and Scottish Railway to Upminster and through-services resumed in 1932. The District Railway was incorporated into London Transport in 1933 and became known as the District line.
 
The new tracks built by the London, Midland and Scottish Railway allowed additional intermediate stations to be constructed on the local lines between 1932 and 1935. Increased local demand was caused by the expansion of the built-up area of suburban London during the interwar period. The station at Upminster Bridge was designed by William Henry Hamlyn, the chief architect of the LMS, and opened with platforms on the local electric lines on 17 December 1934. The station was operated by the London, Midland and Scottish Railway but was only served by District line trains. After nationalisation of the railways in 1948 management of the station passed to British Railways and in 1969 ownership transferred to the London Underground.

Design

The station consists of a central island platform between the tracks that are elevated on a railway embankment. There are four tracks through the site although there are no platforms for the main lines. The full length of the platform is covered by a single canopy with a central waiting room.

The Art Deco red brick ticket office is located below platform level, to which it is connected by a subway and stairway. Although similar to the other single-storey station buildings on this part of the route, it is notable for its high atrium roof and polygonal shape. The floor is tiled with a reversed swastika pattern, a popular decorative design at the time the station was constructed. The station was listed locally as a building of local heritage interest by Havering London Borough Council.

As part of the public–private partnership arrangement for maintenance of the London Underground, the station was refurbished by Metronet during 2005 and 2006. Works included provision of tactile strips and colour contrasted handrails for the visually impaired, installation of closed-circuit television cameras, passenger help points, new electronic departure information displays on the platforms, a new public address system and improved lighting. The station does not have step-free access from the platforms to the street.

Location

The station is named after a nearby crossing of the River Ingrebourne. The river was the boundary between the ancient parishes of Hornchurch and Upminster and the station is located on the western Hornchurch side. The station is situated on Upminster Road in the London Borough of Havering and is flanked by a parade of shops. It is situated in a primarily residential area and is near to Havering Sixth Form College and Hornchurch Stadium.

The London Loop key walking route passes outside the station, and it forms the end point of section 22 from Harold Wood and the starting point of section 23 to Rainham. The station is located on the eastern extremity of the District line and is the penultimate station before the terminus at Upminster.

London Buses routes 193, 248 and 370 serve the station, providing connections to County Park Estate, Cranham, Lakeside, Queen's Hospital and Romford.

Services

The station is in London fare zone 6. The typical off-peak service from the station is 12 District line trains per hour to Upminster and 12 to Earl's Court, of which six continue to Ealing Broadway and six continue to Richmond. At peak periods the number of trains per hour increases to 15 and some trains continue from Earl's Court to Wimbledon. Services towards central London operate from approximately 05:00 to 23:30 and services to Upminster operate from approximately 06:00 to 01:30. The journey time to Upminster is two minutes.

Since 2006, the station has been one of the first on the network to operate without a staffed ticket office.

Total number of passenger entries and exits at the station during the year is as follows:

During 2011 there were 990,000 passenger entries and exits at the station, continuing a trend of growth over the preceding eight years, but lower than neighbouring stations on the route.

References

External links

District line stations
Tube stations in the London Borough of Havering
Former London, Midland and Scottish Railway stations
Railway stations in Great Britain opened in 1934
William Henry Hamlyn buildings